Mzonke Fana (born 29 October 1973) is a professional boxer. He held the IBF super featherweight title twice between 2007 and 2010, and challenged twice for other world titles.

Professional career

Super featherweight
Known as "The Rose of Khayelitsha", he was a virtual unknown in the boxing world until he challenged and defeated Malcolm Klassen for the IBF Super featherweight title in 2007. Prior to that victory, he was knocked out on 9 April 2005 by future Hall of Famer Marco Antonio Barrera in the second round for the WBC Super featherweight title in his first world title challenge.

Lightweight
On 7 December 2013, he fought upcoming fighter Edis Tatli for the WBA Inter-Continental Lightweight Title at the Barona Areena in Espoo, Finland, but lost via unanimous decision. He fought Terry Flanagan for the WBO Lightweight Title and lost via unanimous decision.

Professional boxing record

See also
List of super-featherweight boxing champions

References

External links

1973 births
Living people
Super-featherweight boxers
Lightweight boxers
World super-featherweight boxing champions
International Boxing Federation champions
People from Mhlontlo Local Municipality
South African male boxers